is a 1991 Japanese youth drama film directed by Osamu Murakami. It was released in Japan on June 1, 1991.

Cast

Eri Fukatsu

Toshiyuki Nagashima

Reception
At the 1st Japan Film Professional Awards, it won the award for best film and Osamu Murakami won the award for best director. At the 15th Japan Academy Prize,  was nominated for Best Film Editing.

References

External links

1991 drama films
1991 films
Japanese drama films
1990s Japanese films